Schwarzburg-Sondershausen was a small principality in Germany, in the present day state of Thuringia, with its capital at Sondershausen.

History
Schwarzburg-Sondershausen was a county until 1697. In that year, it became a principality, which lasted until the fall of the German monarchies in 1918, during the German Revolution of 1918–1919. After the German Revolution, it became a republic and joined the Weimar Republic as a constituent state. In 1920, it joined with other small states in the area to form the new state of Thuringia.

Schwarzburg-Sondershausen had an area of 862 km2 (333 sq. mi.) and a population of 85,000 (1905). Towns placed in the state were: Arnstadt, Sondershausen, Gehren, Langewiesen, Großbreitenbach, Ebeleben, Großenehrich, Greußen and Plaue.

Rulers of Schwarzburg-Sondershausen, 1552–1918

Counts of Schwarzburg-Sondershausen
 1552–1586 John Günther I
 1586–1631 Günther XLII, with Anton Henry, John Günther II and Christian Günther I
 1631–1638 Günther XLII, with Anton Henry and Christian Günther I
 1638–1642 Günther XLII, with Christian Günther I
 1642–1643 Günther XLII, with Anton Günther I
 1643–1666 Anton Günther I
 1666–1697 Christian William, with Anton Günther II

Raised to Principality in 1697

Princes of Schwarzburg-Sondershausen
 1697–1716: Anton Günther II
 1697 – 10 May 1721: Christian William
 10 May 1721 – 28 November 1740: Günther XLIII
 28 November 1740 – 6 November 1758: Henry XXXV
 6 November 1758 – 14 October 1794: Christian Günther III
 14 October 1794 – 19 August 1835: Günther Friedrich Karl I
 19 August 1835 – 17 July 1880: Günther Friedrich Karl II
 17 July 1880 – 28 March 1909: Karl Günther
United under Prince Günther Victor of Schwarzburg-Rudolstadt
 28 March 1909 – November 1918: Günther Victor

Heads of the princely house of Schwarzburg 
On the death of the childless Prince Günther Victor in 1925, he was succeeded by Prince Sizzo (1860–1926), who was the son of Prince Friedrich Günther (1793–1867) from his second, morganatic marriage. Prince Sizzo was recognised as a full member of the House of Schwarzburg in 1896. He was succeeded in 1926 by his son, Prince Friedrich Günther (1901–1971). He was the last in the male line.

 1918–1925: Prince Günther Victor (1852–1925)
 1925–1926: Prince Sizzo (1860–1926)
 1926–1971: Prince Friedrich Günther (1901–1971)

Villages with more than 2000 people

See also 
 House of Schwarzburg

References

External links 

Schwarzburg-Sondershausen
1599 establishments in the Holy Roman Empire
1920 disestablishments in Germany
States and territories established in 1599
States of the German Empire
States of the German Confederation
States of the Confederation of the Rhine
States of the Weimar Republic
Principalities of the Holy Roman Empire
States of the North German Confederation